Lane Pederson (born August 4, 1997) is a Canadian professional ice hockey forward for the  Columbus Blue Jackets of the National Hockey League (NHL).

Playing career
Pederson played for the Seattle Thunderbirds, Red Deer Rebels and Swift Current Broncos in the Western Hockey League and signed as a free agent with the Coyotes in October 2016. After playing four seasons in the American Hockey League with the Tucson Roadrunners, he played his first NHL game on April 2, 2021, scoring a goal in a win against the Anaheim Ducks. 

On July 28, 2021, Pederson was traded by the Coyotes to the San Jose Sharks in exchange for a 2024 fourth-round draft pick. He was waived on February 21, 2022, but cleared and returned to the San Jose Barracuda.

On July 13, 2022, Pederson was traded by the Sharks to the Carolina Hurricanes along with Brent Burns, in exchange for forward Steven Lorentz, goaltender Eetu Makiniemi and a conditional 2023 third-round selection. After attending the Hurricanes training camp, Pederson was re-assigned to AHL affiliate, the Chicago Wolves to begin the 2022–23 season. Pederson was scoreless in 4 games with the Wolves before he was traded by the Hurricanes alongside Ethan Bear to the Vancouver Canucks in exchange for a fifth-round pick in 2023.

Initially assigned to the Abbotsford Canucks, Pederson instanly found his offensive touch by scoring 17 goals in only 18 games. Recalled to the NHL, Pederson made his Canucks debut against the Winnipeg Jets on December 17, 2022. He later notched his first goal with the Canucks in recording a multi-point game against the Seattle Kraken on December 22, 2022. After 11 games with the Canucks, Pederson was placed on waivers and was subsequently claimed by the Columbus Blue Jackets on January 28, 2023.

Career statistics

Regular season and playoffs

International

References

External links

1997 births
Living people
Abbotsford Canucks players
Arizona Coyotes players
Chicago Wolves players
Columbus Blue Jackets players
Red Deer Rebels players
Ice hockey people from Saskatchewan
San Jose Barracuda players
San Jose Sharks players
Seattle Thunderbirds players
Sportspeople from Saskatoon
Swift Current Broncos players
Tucson Roadrunners players
Undrafted National Hockey League players
Vancouver Canucks players